Mobile Choice was a long-running UK magazine covering reviews, news and opinions on mobile phones, tablets, apps and accessories. The first issue came out in November 1996, and it was published bi-monthly by Noble House Media, which was based in London. Mobile Choice celebrated its 200th issue in March 2013.

In April 2016, Mobile Choice was bought by Future plc and in March 2017 the decision was made to cease publication of the magazine and updates to its website.

The 100-page magazine had a news section, in-depth independent reviews and features, how-to guides and each issue came with a buying guide of over 150 phones, as well as an archive of past mobile phone reviews.

The magazine's last editor was Sunetra Chakravarti (now editor at The European Information Security Summit).

Previous editors included:

 Natasha Stokes
 Mike Shaw (now head of content at Direct Line Group) 
 Huw Morgan (now Director, Internal Communications, Good Relations - VCCP Partnership)

Mobile Choice Consumer Awards 
Mobile Choice organised and hosted the annual Mobile Choice Consumer Awards which used both a panel of experts and reader votes to award the top mobile handsets, accessories and service providers over the past 12 months. Categories included Phone of the Year, Tablet of the Year, Best Value Tablet, Showstopper 2015, Best Design, Best Online Retailer, Most Innovative Device, Best Camera phone, Best Value Phone, Best Network, Best Value Network, Best Customer Care, Best High Street Retailer, Best In-Store Customer Experience, Connected Gadget of the Year, Fashtech of the Year, Phablet of the Year and Manufacturer of the Year.

2019 Mobile Choice Consumer Award Winners

2013 Mobile Choice Consumer Award Winners

2012 Mobile Choice Consumer Award Winners

2008 Mobile Choice Consumer Award Winners

References

External links
 Official website

Bi-monthly magazines published in the United Kingdom
Business magazines published in the United Kingdom
Defunct magazines published in the United Kingdom
Magazines published in London
Magazines established in 1996
Magazines disestablished in 2017
Professional and trade magazines